The Philippines competed at the 2019 World Athletics Championships in Doha, Qatar, from 27 September to 6 October 2019. The Philippines was represented by a lone athlete; pole vaulter Ernest Obiena.

Results
(q – qualified, NM – no mark, SB – season best)

Men
Field events

References

Nations at the 2019 World Athletics Championships
World Championships in Athletics
2019